Dub 56 is the fifth album released by the ska group The Toasters. It was released at a time in which ska punk was looking to break into the mainstream.

Track listing - Original 

"Direction" – 2:43
"Freedom" – 4:07
"Mona" – 3:05
"Dancin'" – 3:28
"Dub 56" – 2:45
"Sweet Cherie" – 3:52
"Tunisia" – 2:35
"Little Hidden Secrets" – 2:49
"Marlboro Man" – 2:50
"Ain't Nuthin" – 3:13
"Razor Cut" – 3:14
"Legal Shot" - 3:18
"Midnight Hour" – 2:32
"Goody Goody" - 2:18

Track Listing - Special Edition

Disc 1
"Direction" – 2:43
"Freedom" – 4:07
"Mona" – 3:05
"Dancin'" – 3:28
"Dub 56" – 2:45
"Sweet Cherie" – 3:52
"Tunisia" – 2:35
"Little Hidden Secrets" – 2:49
"Marlboro Man" – 2:50
"Ain't Nuthin" – 3:13
"Razor Cut" – 3:14
"Legal Shot" - 3:18
"Midnight Hour" – 2:32
"Goody Goody" - 2:18
"Dub 56 (Chat Mix)" - 2:48
"Legal Shot (Dance Mix)" - 6:59
"Legal Shot (Gangster Mix)" - 9:02
"Ain't Nuthin' (Chorus Mix)" - 3:14

Disc 2
"Matt Davis (Live in San Diego)" - 3:37
"Too Hip to Be Cool (Live in San Diego)" - 3:14
"Social Security (Live in San Diego)" - 2:58
"Mono (Live in San Diego)" - 3:05
"Thrill Me Up (Live in San Diego)" - 3:46
"Legal Shot (Live in San Diego)" - 3:46
"Go Girl (Live in San Diego)" - 3:04
"East Side Beat (Live in San Diego)" - 5:24
"Pool Shark (Live in San Diego)" - 4:35
"Weekend in L.A. (Live in LA)" - 4:11
"History Book (Live in LA)" - 3:42
"Decision At Midnight (Live in LA)" - 3:52
"Mona (Live in LA)" - 3:05
"Thrill Me Up (Live in LA)" - 3:58
"Legal Shot (Live in LA)" - 3:28
"Shebeen (Live in LA)" - 4:12
"East Side Beat (Live in LA)" - 5:39

References

1994 albums
Moon Ska Records albums
The Toasters albums